Albert "Appel" Ooiman (7 August 1905 – 6 June 1971) was a Dutch rower. He competed at the 1928 Summer Olympics in Amsterdam with the men's eight where they were eliminated in round two.

References

1905 births
1971 deaths
Dutch male rowers
Olympic rowers of the Netherlands
Rowers at the 1928 Summer Olympics
Sportspeople from Leeuwarden
European Rowing Championships medalists
20th-century Dutch people